Women's Enemy is a 2013 Chinese inspirational film directed and written by Guan Xiaojie, starring Zhao Yihuan, Wen Zhuo, Chen Ou, Liu Huipu, Qiu Xiaochan, Wang Mengting, and Wen Mengyang.

Cast
Zhao Yihuan as Sun Xiaomei
Wen Zhuo as Tian Kai
Chen Ou as President Chen
Liu Huipu as He Shuai
Qiu Xiaochan as Xiao Chan
Wang Mengting as Ma Qiao
Wen Mengyang as Mu Yan

Music
 Xiao Fei - "Give Me A Little Courage"

References

External links
 
 

Chinese comedy films